Wake Up and Dream may refer to:
 Wake Up and Dream (musical), a 1929 musical revue
 Wake Up and Dream (1934 film), an American musical film
 Wake Up and Dream (1946 film), a Technicolor film
 Wake Up and Dream (novel), a 2011 science fiction novel by Ian R. MacLeod